Injury Time may refer to:
Injury time
Injury Time (novel), a novel by Beryl Bainbridge
Injury Time (radio series), a radio comedy programme